Eucalyptus virginea is a species of tree that is endemic to the south coast of Western Australia. It has smooth bark, narrow lance-shaped to curved adult leaves, flower buds in groups of seven, white flowers and cup-shaped fruit.

Description
It has smooth pale grey bark, sometimes with insect scribbles. Flowering occurs from December or January to July and the flowers are white.

Taxonomy and naming
Eucalyptus virginea was first formally described in 2004 by Stephen Hopper and Greg Wardell-Johnson in the journal Nuytsia from specimens collected in the Mount Lindesay National Park (now part of the Mount Barney National Park) in 1993. The specific epithet (virginea) is from the Latin word virgineus meaning "pure white", referring to the white bark, but also to the forester Barney White.

Distribution and habitat
This eucalypt grows in the transition zone between creek lines where karri (Eucalyptus diversicolor) dominates, and drier uplands where marri (Corymbia calophylla) and jarrah (Eucalyptus marginata) dominate. It occurs in the Mount Lindesay area, north of Denmark.

Conservation status
This species is classified as "Priority Four" by the Government of Western Australia Department of Parks and Wildlife, meaning that is rare or near threatened.

See also
List of Eucalyptus species

References

Eucalypts of Western Australia
Trees of Australia
virginea
Myrtales of Australia
Plants described in 2004
Taxa named by Stephen Hopper